The 1957 season was the Hawthorn Football Club's 33rd season in the Victorian Football League and 56th overall. This was the first time since 1923 Hawthorn qualified for finals, and the first time since joining the VFL in 1925.

Fixture

Night Series

Due to the popularity of the night series cup every team competed in the 1957 night series.

Premiership Season

Finals Series

Ladder

References

Hawthorn Football Club seasons